Erastus Tjejamba (born 1936) was the Chairman of the Executive Committee of Hereroland from September 1984 to August 1987 and from October 1987 to February 1988. In this position he was the highest representative of his bantustan to the South African apartheid administration in South-West Africa.

References

 He was the grandfather of Miss Southern Africa 2008/09 Miss Shenaaz Vetjituavi Tjejamba.

1936 births
Namibian politicians
Herero people
Living people